Stéphan Caron (sometimes spelled Stéphane Caron, born 1 July 1966 in Rouen, Seine-Maritime) is a former freestyle swimmer from France.

Caron won the bronze medal in the men's 100 m freestyle at the Summer Olympics twice in a row, starting in 1988. In 1985, he won the European title in the 100 m freestyle.

References

External links
 
 

1966 births
Living people
ISG Business School alumni
French male freestyle swimmers
Olympic swimmers of France
Swimmers at the 1984 Summer Olympics
Swimmers at the 1988 Summer Olympics
Swimmers at the 1992 Summer Olympics
Olympic bronze medalists for France
Olympic bronze medalists in swimming
World Aquatics Championships medalists in swimming
European Aquatics Championships medalists in swimming
Sportspeople from Rouen
Medalists at the 1992 Summer Olympics
Medalists at the 1988 Summer Olympics
Universiade medalists in swimming
Universiade gold medalists for France
Universiade silver medalists for France
Medalists at the 1991 Summer Universiade
Medalists at the 1985 Summer Universiade